Rangaswamy is a surname. Notable people with the surname include:

Rangaswamy Nataraja Mudaliar (1885–1972), Indian film director
Rangaswamy Narasimhan (1926–2007), Indian computer and cognitive scientist
Adithiya Rangaswamy (born 1994), Botswana cricketer
Hotte Paksha Rangaswamy (1933–2007), political leader from the Indian state of Karnataka
Jeevarathinam Rangaswamy (born 1921), a leader of Indian National Congress from Tamil Nadu
M. Rangaswamy, Indian politician and was elected member for the Tamil Nadu Legislative Assembly
N. Rangaswamy (born 1950), Indian politician, Chief Minister of the Union Territory of Puducherry
Ponnuswamy Rangaswamy (born 1964), Indian weightlifter
Shantha Rangaswamy, (born 1954), Indian cricketer
Manchanahalli Rangaswamy Satyanarayana Rao (born 1948), Indian scientist from Mysore, India
Rangaswamy Srinivasan (born 1929), physical chemist and inventor with a 30-year career at IBM Research

See also
Bilikal Rangaswamy Betta, hill near Kanakapura town in the Indian state of Karnataka
Rangaswamy Peak and Pillar, rocky column in Kotagiri, The Nilgiris, Tamil Nadu
K.S. Rangaswamy College of Technology, engineering college affiliated to Anna University, Chennai, Tamil Nadu, south India